Malcolm Stewart Hannibal McArthur (1872–1934) was the first British resident of Brunei. The son of General Charles McArthur and his wife Lucy Large, he was born in Medway, Kent. He was educated in Kelly College, Tavistock and Queen's college, University of Oxford. McArthur was appointed in 1895 in London after an open competition to Hong Kong and Strait Settlements civil service (later known as Malayan civil service). He was dispatched to Brunei to make recommendations about the structure of the administration for the "dying sultanate". McArthur was appointed Acting Consul in April 1904, arrived to Brunei on 3 May and remained until 10 November. Following his Report on Brunei in 1904 the British government decided to maintain Brunei as a separate administrative entity.

Malcolm retired in 1922, due to ill health, moving to Italy where he died in 21 February 1934.

Works

References

External links
  "Coming of the saviour" By Dr B. A. Hussainmiya

1872 births
1934 deaths
Alumni of the University of Oxford
People from Medway
Administrators in British Brunei